This is a list of MPs elected to the House of Commons at the 10th 1831 United Kingdom general election, arranged by constituency. The Parliament was summoned on 23 April 1831 and voting took place primarily in May. It first assembled on 14 June 1831 and was dissolved on 3 December 1832. The Prime Minister was the leader of the Whig Party, Charles Grey, 2nd Earl Grey. The Speaker of the House was Charles Manners-Sutton, the member for Scarborough.



Notes

See also
1831 United Kingdom general election
List of United Kingdom by-elections (1818–1832)
List of parliaments of England
List of parliaments of Great Britain
List of parliaments of the United Kingdom

 
1831
List
UK MPs